TZA may refer to:

 thiazolidinedione
 Belize City Municipal Airport
 The Former call sign of WRNN-TV, WTZA.